The 2003 Wan Chai District Council election was held on 23 November 2003 to elect all 11 elected members to the 14-member District Council.

Overall election results
Before election:

Change in composition:

Results by constituency

Broadwood

Canal Road

Causeway Bay

Happy Valley

Hennessy

Jardine's Lookout

Oi Kwan

Southorn

Stubbs Road

Tai Fat Hau

Tai Hang

References

2003 Hong Kong local elections
Wan Chai District Council elections